Bhairabi Temple is a temple in India.
It may also refer to:
 Bhairabi Temple, Nuwakot, a temple in Nepal